Mardi Himal is a  peak beneath the much more prominent Machapuchare in the Annapurna region of Nepal, from which it is separated by a  col. It was first summited in 1961 by Basil Goodfellow.

In 2012, the Mardi Himal Trek was opened, following a ridge towards the summit, with lodges and teahouses open to an elevation of 3,550m, with a further climb to "Base Camp" at 4,500m. The peak itself is classified by the Nepalese government as a "trekking peak" and is offered by many expedition companies.

References 

Mountains of the Himalayas
Mountains of the Gandaki Province
Five-thousanders of the Himalayas